Argyrotaenia neibana is a species of moth of the family Tortricidae. It is found in the Dominican Republic.

References

neibana
Moths of the Caribbean
Moths described in 1999